Sir Anthony Derrick Parsons  (9 September 1922 – 12 August 1996) was a British diplomat, ambassador to Iran at the time of the Iranian Revolution and Permanent Representative to the UN at the time of the Falklands War.

Career

Anthony Parsons was educated at King's School, Canterbury. He served as an artillery officer during the Second World War and was awarded the Military Cross at the end of the war in August 1945. He was then given the opportunity to read Oriental Languages at Balliol College, Oxford as an apprenticeship to a career in the diplomatic service and achieved a First Class degree. He remained in the army to serve as Assistant Military Attaché in Baghdad 1952–54.

Parsons joined the Foreign Office in 1954 and served in the British embassies in Ankara, Amman, Cairo and Khartoum, and was Political Agent in Bahrain 1965–69. He was Counsellor in the UK Mission to the United Nations in New York City 1969–71 and Under-Secretary, Foreign and Commonwealth Office, 1971–74.

Parsons was British Ambassador to Iran 1974–79 and mistakenly predicted the survival of the Shah of Iran shortly before his downfall in the Iranian Revolution. In 1979 he was appointed UK Permanent Representative to the United Nations; in April 1982 after the outbreak of the Falklands War he tabled a resolution which was adopted as United Nations Security Council Resolution 502 demanding an immediate cessation of hostilities and a withdrawal of Argentine forces.

Sir Anthony retired from the Diplomatic Service in 1982 and was part-time special adviser to the then prime minister, Margaret Thatcher, on foreign affairs 1982–83. He also served on the board of the British Council 1982–86. In 1984 he became a research fellow at the University of Exeter and lectured there 1984–87.

Anthony Parsons was appointed LVO in 1965, CMG in 1969, knighted KCMG in 1975 and GCMG in 1982. The Sudanese government awarded him the Order of the Two Niles in 1965. Balliol College, Oxford, gave him an Honorary Fellowship in 1984. 

In 1995, Parson wrote the foreword to Century Story, the autobiography of his cousin Claudia Parsons, the first woman to circumnavigate the globe by car. 

Sir Anthony was portrayed by Robert Hardy in The Falklands Play.

Publications
 The Pride and the Fall: Iran 1974–1979; Jonathan Cape, London, 1984. 
 Vultures and Philistines: British Attitudes to Culture and Cultural Diplomacy, British Council 50th anniversary lecture, in International Affairs vol.61, no.1, Blackwell, 1984
 They Say the Lion: Britain's legacy to the Arabs: a personal memoir; Jonathan Cape, London, 1986. 
 The United Nations and the quest for peace (with Professor Alan James), special paper no.11, Welsh Centre for International Affairs, 1986. 
 Antarctica : the next decade (ed.); report of a group study chaired by Sir Anthony Parsons, Cambridge University Press, 1987. 
 The Saddamic verses: a personal sketch in verse and prose of the Iraqi conflict from August 1990 by Charmian Steele, introduction by Sir Anthony Parsons, illustrated exclusively by the work of photographers for The Independent; Charmian Steele, UK, 1991. 
 Peace in the Middle East? (introduction); The Oxford International Review (special issue), 1992. 
 Terrorism and democracy: some contemporary cases, report of a study group of the David Davies Memorial Institute of International Studies, ed. Peter Janke, introduction by Sir Anthony Parsons; Macmillan in association with the David Davies Memorial Institute of International Studies, London, 1992. 
 The United Nations in the Post-Cold War Era in International Relations, December 1992, vol.11 no.3, pp189–200
 Central Asia, the last decolonisation, David Davies Memorial Institute of International Studies, Occasional paper no.4, London 1993
 The Security Council : an uncertain future, David Davies Memorial Institute of International Studies, Occasional paper no.8, London, 1994. 
 Human rights and civil conflict in the post-imperial world (Eileen Illtyd David memorial lecture, 1993); University College of Swansea, 1994. 
 From Cold War to Hot Peace: UN interventions 1947–1994; Michael Joseph, London, 1995.

References

Sources
 PARSONS, Sir Anthony (Derrick), Who Was Who, A & C Black, 1920–2008; online edn, Oxford University Press, Dec 2007, accessed 10 March 2012
 Parsons, Sir Anthony Derrick (1922–1996) by Glencairn Balfour-Paul, Oxford Dictionary of National Biography, Oxford University Press, 2004
 Obituary: Sir Anthony Parsons, The Independent, London, 14 August 1996
 Sir Anthony Parsons, British Diplomat, Is Dead at 73, Obituary, New York Times, 14 August 1996
 Parsons, Sir Anthony Derrick, Transcript of interview, British Diplomatic Oral History Programme, Churchill College, Cambridge, 1996

Offices held

External links
Interview with Sir Anthony Derrick Parsons & transcript, British Diplomatic Oral History Programme, Churchill College, Cambridge, 1996

1922 births
1996 deaths
People educated at The King's School, Canterbury
Alumni of Balliol College, Oxford
Academics of the University of Exeter
Ambassadors of the United Kingdom to Iran
Permanent Representatives of the United Kingdom to the United Nations
Recipients of the Military Cross
Lieutenants of the Royal Victorian Order
Knights Grand Cross of the Order of St Michael and St George
British Army personnel of World War II
Royal Artillery officers
British expatriates in Turkey
British expatriates in Jordan
British expatriates in Egypt
British expatriates in Sudan
Recipients of orders, decorations, and medals of Sudan